Mount Arlington (also known as the Howard Boulevard Park and Ride) is a commuter railroad station for New Jersey Transit. Located in the borough of Mount Arlington, Morris County, New Jersey, United States, the station is located next to interchange 30 on Interstate 80. The station serves as a park-and-ride for commuters to catch trains for Hoboken Terminal and New York Penn Station. Trains use the Montclair-Boonton Line and Morristown Line to serve locales between Hackettstown and the eastern terminals. Lakeland Bus Lines also services Mount Arlington station. The station is handicapped accessible as part of the Americans with Disabilities Act of 1990. The station features two side platforms and two tracks with elevators.

Railroad history in Mount Arlington began on January 16, 1854, with an extension of the Morris and Essex Railroad from Dover to Hackettstown. The station was renamed on July 1, 1891 from Drakesville to Mount Arlington. A new station was opened later that year. Passenger service ended at Mount Arlington on November 8, 1942 and service was merged with nearby Lake Hopatcong station in Landing.

The current station at Mount Arlington began construction on June 12, 2006 with a groundbreaking ceremony headlined by Rodney P. Frelinghuysen (R–NJ). This new station would join a park and ride already built for buses at Howard Boulevard (Morris County Route 615). Despite a slated 2007 opening, the station opened to the public on January 21, 2008.

History 
Mount Arlington was the site of a former Delaware, Lackawanna and Western Railroad station, that replaced the old Drakesville station in modern-day Ledgewood that opened on January 16, 1854. That station burned on February 19, 1867. The railroad closed Drakesville station in 1891 when they built the new station at Mount Arlington,  to the east. The Mount Arlington station itself closed on November 8, 1942.

Station layout
Mount Arlington has two high-level side platforms.

Bibliography

References

External links

Official station information page
Project planning page
View from Interstate 80 (Google Maps)

Railway stations in Morris County, New Jersey
NJ Transit Rail Operations stations
Railway stations in the United States opened in 1854
1854 establishments in New Jersey
Former Delaware, Lackawanna and Western Railroad stations